The 24.5" Mark I torpedo was a British torpedo carried only on Nelson-class battleships. This was the type of torpedo that HMS Rodney fired at the German battleship Bismarck, "the only known occasion that a battleship fired torpedoes at an enemy battleship."

This torpedo design was the inspiration for the Japanese Type 93 'Long Lance' torpedoes.

References 

World War II naval weapons of the United Kingdom
Torpedoes of the United Kingdom